Luis Javier Lukin (born 5 August 1963) is a former Spanish racing cyclist. He rode in twelve Grand Tours between 1986 and 1992.

Major results
1987
 3rd Overall Vuelta a Cantabria

Grand Tour general classification results timeline

References

External links
 

1963 births
Living people
Spanish male cyclists
Cyclists from Navarre
People from Estella Oriental